Bashi Creek, also historically known as Bashai Creek, is a tributary of the Tombigbee River in northern Clarke County in Alabama.

Location
It is located above the Coffeeville Lock and Dam and is the only inlet off the river for several miles. There is a paved boat ramp located on the creek.

Etymology
The creek first appears on an 1844 map as Bashai Creek.  Language scholars believe Bashi to be an adaptation of the Choctaw language word bachaya, meaning "line," "row," or "course".

Bashi Formation
The creek has lent its name to the Bashi Formation, formerly also known as the Woods Bluff Formation, a greensand marl strata dating to the early Eocene.  The creek flows through the exposed strata of the formation.

Bashi Skirmish
The Bashi Skirmish in the Creek War was fought near the banks of this creek and took its name from the waterway.

References

Rivers of Alabama
Tributaries of the Tombigbee River
Rivers of Clarke County, Alabama
Alabama placenames of Native American origin